Durgada may refer to:

Durgada, Kakinada district, a village in Gollaprolu mandal, Kakinada district, Andhra Pradesh, India
Durgada, Yavatmal district, a village in Maregaon tahsil, Yavatmal district, Maharastra, India
Durgada, Wardha district, a village in Deoli tahsil, Wardha district, Maharastra, India